Allenella planorum, also known as the angular pinhead snail, is a species of land snail that is endemic to Australia's Lord Howe Island in the Tasman Sea.

Description
The turbinate shell of the mature snail is 2.3 mm in height, with a diameter of 3.4 mm, and a low conical spire. It is amber to light bronze in colour. The whorls are rounded above and below an angular periphery, with impressed sutures and closely spaced radial ribs. It has an ovately lunate aperture and narrowly open umbilicus.

Distribution and habitat
The snail is most common in the North Beach and settlement areas of the island, with scattered records from elsewhere.

References

 
 

 
planorum
Gastropods of Lord Howe Island
Taxa named by Tom Iredale
Gastropods described in 1944